Xiaomi Pad 5 is a line of Android-based tablet computers manufactured by Xiaomi. It was announced on August 10, 2021 with Xiaomi MIX 4.

References

External Links 
 
 
 

Xiaomi
Tablet computers introduced in 2021
Tablet computers